Heikki Johannes Kovalainen (born 19 October 1981) is a Finnish racing driver competing in the Japan Rally Championship for Rally Team AICELLO. He raced in Formula One between 2007 and 2013 for the Renault, McLaren, Team Lotus, Caterham and Lotus F1 teams, scoring a single victory at the 2008 Hungarian Grand Prix. After leaving Formula One, he raced in the Japanese Super GT series between 2015 and 2021, where he won the championship in 2016.

He was supported by the Renault Driver Development programme early in his racing career, during which he won the World Series by Nissan championship and finished runner-up in the GP2 series. He gained his first podium by finishing second in the Japanese Grand Prix that year.

He moved to McLaren for the  season, where he partnered Lewis Hamilton. His second season in Formula One saw him achieve his first pole position at Silverstone and his first victory at the Hungaroring, becoming the 100th driver to win a Formula One Grand Prix. He remained with the team for the  season.

Although he didn't score points in the uncompetitive cars, he earned respect for outperforming drivers who were racing in similarly uncompetitive cars. Kovalainen competed in the last two races of the  season for Lotus F1 as a short-notice stand-in for regular driver Kimi Räikkönen.

In 2015, Kovalainen moved to Japan to compete in Super GT in the GT500 class with Team SARD. He won the championship in his second season in the series in 2016.

Early career

Karting (1991–2000)
Born in Suomussalmi, Finland, Kovalainen's career began in kart racing, much like that of many other race car drivers. He competed in karting from 1991 to 2000, during which time he finished runner-up in the Finnish Formula A championship in 1999 and 2000. In 2000 he won the Nordic championship and the Paris-Bercy Elf Masters event, as well as finished third in the World Formula Super A Championship, leading him to be elected as the Finnish Kart Driver of the Year.

Formula Renault (2001)
Kovalainen began his car racing career in the British Formula Renault Championship, which fellow Finn Kimi Räikkönen had won in 2000 before moving straight into Formula One with Sauber. Kovalainen's apprenticeship in the junior categories of motor sport was more conventional, but he used Renault power at every step along the way. He finished fourth in the championship with two wins, two pole positions, five podiums and three fastest laps, earning the Rookie of the Year award. He also took part in the Formula Three Macau Grand Prix, where he finished eighth.

Formula Three (2002)

Kovalainen attracted the support of the Renault Driver Development programme and in 2002 moved up to the British Formula 3 Championship with Fortec Motorsport who used Renault engines. He became one of the most competitive drivers on the grid by the second half of the season and all five of his wins came in the final nine races. With three pole positions and three fastest laps, Kovalainen finished third overall in the championship behind Robbie Kerr and James Courtney and he was again Rookie of the Year.

He also demonstrated strong form in the international non-championship rounds, with second place in Macau and fourth place at the Marlboro Masters at Zandvoort.

World Series by Nissan (2003–2004)
Kovalainen moved into the Renault-owned World Series by Nissan in 2003 – but faced a tough teammate at the Gabord team in Franck Montagny. Montagny had already spent two seasons in the World Series and had won the championship in 2001. Montagny won the 2003 title with nine wins to Kovalainen's one.

Kovalainen continued in the series in 2004, but moved to Pons Racing, where he won the championship ahead of Tiago Monteiro, with 192 points and six wins. With Kimi Räikkönen finishing seventh in Formula One and Marcus Grönholm fifth in the World Rally Championship, Kovalainen received the Finnish Driver of the Year award.

GP2 Series (2005)
In 2005, Kovalainen entered the GP2 Series, the new 'feeder' series for F1 and the successor to Formula 3000. Driving for the Arden International team, Kovalainen began the season with strong results by winning the first round of the championship in Imola and then finishing third in the sprint race. In Barcelona he scored his third consecutive podium, but in the sprint race his car stalled on the grid. He dominated the race in Monaco by claiming pole position, leading the race for the first 21 laps and clocking the fastest lap of the race. Problems during his pitstop, however, dropped him down to fifth. At the Nürburgring he gave his best performance yet, by winning the race from 17th on the grid. In the sprint race José María López caused a collision which forced Kovalainen to retire. At Magny-Cours he won again from fourth on the grid, and came third in the sprint race.

At this point in the season, however, a resurgent Nico Rosberg with his ART Grand Prix team seemed to find more speed and began scoring victories, emerging as Kovalainen's main rival for the championship. Kovalainen and Arden fought back, scoring podiums and points positions in Silverstone, Hockenheim and Hungaroring, but were unable to find the necessary speed to beat Rosberg. In Istanbul's feature race Kovalainen finished tenth due to engine problems, but in the sprint race held in wet conditions he returned to his winning ways. At Monza Arden were fast again, and Kovalainen snatched his second pole of the season and won the feature race. In the sprint race he could only manage fifth position, however, and this meant that with four races left in the season, Kovalainen was leading Rosberg by only four points.

After a chaotic weekend at Spa affected by rain and Safety Cars, Rosberg took the lead from Kovalainen. In the final two rounds in Bahrain, Rosberg and ART seemed to be unmatched again, and he secured the championship by winning the feature race with Kovalainen finishing third. Retiring from the last sprint race, Kovalainen finished runner-up in the series, 15 points adrift.

Formula One

Renault (2004–2007)

2004–2006

Kovalainen, Franck Montagny and José María López tested the Renault R23B F1 car at Barcelona in December 2003.

Renault's lead driver Fernando Alonso had signed for McLaren for the  season, and Renault elected to promote Kovalainen in his place, which they confirmed on 6 September 2006. Team boss Flavio Briatore said: "With Kovalainen, I hope to find the anti-Alonso."

2007
His season got off to a rough start; he made several mistakes during the race, finishing tenth. Flavio Briatore felt it was a disappointing debut for the young Finn and hoped the real Kovalainen would show up next time.

Kovalainen scored his first World Championship point in his second Grand Prix at Sepang, Malaysia, and followed this with a ninth place in Bahrain. He then secured seventh place in Barcelona, outperforming teammate Giancarlo Fisichella, but finished down the order in Monaco, in 13th.

In Canada he made mistakes throughout practice, including one at the exit of turn 7, and hit the barrier. He crashed at the first chicane in qualifying, and damaged his rear wing significantly, and failed to make it through to the second qualifying session. In the race he made progress early on, and then halted. He had luck with the strategy and the Safety Car, and a podium was within his grasp, but he could not find a way past Alexander Wurz of Williams, who had also started towards the rear of the pack. Kovalainen was pulling away from the Ferrari of Kimi Räikkönen in the closing stages, which was a real confidence booster for the team.

He held Räikkönen off, and led the race at the end of his first stint when the cars ahead of him made their pit stops. He re-joined behind Räikkönen and looked comfortable in sixth place until Nick Heidfeld's BMW Sauber broke down in front of him, and thus, Kovalainen finished fifth, while teammate Fisichella failed to score points.

The second half of the European season failed to produce equally strong results, but it did keep the points tally ticking over. Kovalainen had to pit for repairs and eventually finished 15th.

Kovalainen scored a point at both the Nürburgring and the Hungaroring, and scored three more in Turkey, with Kovalainen coming ahead of Robert Kubica. Kovalainen again led the Grand Prix when cars ahead of him made their pit stops. Seventh place at Monza was a fair result. The team took a gamble in the next race at Spa-Francorchamps, with Kovalainen on a one-stop strategy while his challengers for the rear end of the points were all on two-stop strategies, which included the BMW's of Heidfeld and Kubica (who was docked ten places down the grid due to an engine change), Nico Rosberg and Mark Webber. A good start from Kovalainen saw him become a mobile chicane for all of them except Webber. The gamble did not pay off, although Kovalainen held off Kubica in the closing stages to secure the final points position. While most of his rivals got into trouble one way or another in the hazardous wet conditions, Kovalainen did not and held off Kimi Räikkönen in the closing laps to take second place and his first podium in Formula One.

At the start of the race Ralf Schumacher collided with Kovalainen, forcing him to pit. His teammate Fisichella was involved in a collision with Sakon Yamamoto. On lap 36 he felt a vibration at the left rear, and suddenly something on the rear suspension snapped, launching Kovalainen into the barriers. The retirement, possibly caused by damage from the collision with Schumacher, was his first of the season, meaning he lost the once-in-a-lifetime opportunity of becoming the first driver to finish all of the races in his first season.

McLaren (2008–2009)
At the end of the 2007 season Fernando Alonso returned to Renault, and Kovalainen was left with offers from Toyota and McLaren. Kovalainen joined Keke Rosberg, Mika Häkkinen and Kimi Räikkönen as Finnish drivers that have driven for McLaren.

2008

He overtook Fernando Alonso on the final lap, but then accidentally hit the pit lane limiter granting fourth place to Alonso, himself finishing fifth, but Kovalainen did set the fastest lap of the race.

In Malaysia he was penalised five places for blocking Nick Heidfeld's BMW Sauber in the latter stages of qualifying, dropping to eighth. Kovalainen finished the race third as Hamilton faced problems in the pits, and Ferrari's Felipe Massa retired due to a spin. In Bahrain he flatspotted a tyre on the first lap and was consequently well off the pace of the Ferraris and the BMW Saubers. Towards the end he improved and recorded the fastest lap of the race again, coming home fifth.

Kovalainen's car was almost completely buried under the tyres. The Safety Car was deployed for six laps as the debris was removed, and he was finally removed from the car and placed on a stretcher, at which point he gave a "thumbs-up". He was then taken by helicopter to a Barcelona area hospital for further tests. His final condition was a minor concussion, whilst also complaining of a sore elbow and neck. Kovalainen apparently did not lose consciousness at any point, according to the people who assisted him at the scene, but he himself had no memory of the accident nor of giving the "thumbs-up". The first thing he remembered was waking up at the hospital and the team doctor telling him what had happened. Kovalainen was released from the hospital two days later and he was able to race in Turkey. The cause of the accident was later determined to have been a production error on the wheel rim.

Hamilton's more aggressive driving style meant that he had to adopt a three-stop strategy for the race due to concerns over his tyres' durability at Istanbul Park, while Kovalainen was able to use a two-stop strategy. Kovalainen qualified in second place, but suffered a puncture during a fight with Kimi Räikkönen in the first corner and dropped back to finish the race in 12th place.

More disappointment was to follow in Monaco when a software glitch stalled his car on the grid. He was able to start from the pitlane after the mechanics changed his steering wheel, and he made his way up to score a point for eighth place. In Montreal, Kovalainen experienced difficulties with his tyres, as they seemed to degrade much more rapidly than Hamilton's, and the team was forced to tell him to take it easy in order to avoid a puncture. He finished ninth, and later described his race as a total catastrophe, suspecting the tyre issues had something to do with his driving style. At the  Kovalainen started tenth on the grid, after being docked five places for blocking Mark Webber in qualifying, and finished the race in fourth.

At Silverstone, Kovalainen achieved his first pole position, and led the race for the first four laps, before Hamilton passed him at Stowe. Despite two spins due to losing grip on the wet circuit, Kovalainen finished fifth. After the race Kovalainen reported similar tyre problems that he suffered in Canada; after a few laps the rear tyres were completely degraded and had lost their grip.

At the  Kovalainen finished fifth. He won his first race at Hungary and became the 100th driver to win a Formula One Grand Prix after race leader Felipe Massa retired due to an engine failure with three laps remaining. After the race Kovalainen commented: "In previous races my driving was too hard on the tyres. For this race we made somewhat radical changes to the set-up, and they were definitely a step in the right direction." He finished the following race in Valencia in fourth position, which moved him into the top five in the championship.

In September Kovalainen elaborated on the tyre issues for Autosport. The problem seemed to be indeed caused by his different driving style compared to Hamilton, particularly the way he enters corners, uses brakes differently and then accelerates. Hamilton turns the car in a shorter time whereas Kovalainen is trying to make the corners more round, inadvertently causing more wear on the tyres. They had made progress by adapting the car and working on his driving style.

In Belgium he qualified third, but lost eight places at the start. On lap ten he collided with Mark Webber and was given a drive-through penalty, which dropped him to fifteenth place. He worked his way back up to seventh, but on the final lap had to retire due to a gearbox failure, which left him outside the points. At the  he qualified second behind Sebastian Vettel in the tricky wet conditions. In the race Kovalainen developed brake temperature problems, however, and could not match Vettel's pace, finishing in second place, but was disappointed at the lost chance for a win.

In Singapore, Kovalainen qualified fifth, and tried to overtake Kubica for fourth place at the start of the race, but they made contact at Turn 3, causing Kovalainen to lose two places to Glock and Vettel. During a Safety Car period, both McLarens pitted at the same time and Kovalainen had to queue up behind Hamilton, dropping him down the order to 14th. He ultimately finished tenth.

Prior to the  Kovalainen discussed his driving style and the tyre problems in an interview with the Finnish newspaper Turun Sanomat, feeling they had now solved the issues. He explained his driving style was now very close to Hamilton's, as well as his car set-up. Hamilton's aggressive driving style seemed to work the best with the McLaren MP4-23, allowing the tyres to last longer. Hamilton hits the brakes harder and turns the car more quickly into the corner, while Kovalainen's softer driving style would be to drive with a longer curve into the corner, going easier on the brakes and accelerating halfway through the corner. Since the McLaren was harder on the tyres than the Renault and the Bridgestones were not quite as robust as the Michelins, that driving style now led to excessive tyre degradation. In Japan Kovalainen qualified third behind Hamilton and Kimi Räikkönen. During the initial tussle between Hamilton and Räikkönen, Kovalainen was pushed off the track along with several other cars. Kovalainen was running in third when on lap 17 his car suffered an engine failure.

In the race, Kovalainen's first set of front tyres had been marked incorrectly, so the left tyre was installed on the right-hand side of the car and vice versa, meaning the tyres were spinning in the wrong direction, causing understeer. He reported the understeer on the radio, and during his first pit stop the mechanics tried to improve the situation by raising the front-wing angle. Now that he also had correctly marked tyres, however, meant that the front-wing was now causing oversteer and making the front of the car heavier. This possibly caused the puncture to his front right tyre on lap 35, forcing him to pit and drop down to 17th, before he finally retired on lap 49 due to a hydraulics problem.

Kovalainen eventually finished seventh.

2009

At the start of the  season McLaren were struggling for pace. Both Kovalainen and Hamilton failed to get into the top ten in qualifying for the first two races.

In China he scored his first points of the season by finishing fifth. This was followed by back-to-back sixth places at Spa and Monza, and seventh in Singapore. He ended the season with 22 points having had five retirements, this left him in 12th position in the championship. On 18 November it was announced that recently crowned world champion Jenson Button had been signed on a multi year deal as Hamilton's teammate leaving Kovalainen without a 2010 F1 drive.

Lotus (2010–2011)

2010

It was announced on 14 December 2009, that Kovalainen would drive for Lotus Racing in 2010 along with Jarno Trulli. The car was off the pace in pre-season testing, due to a lack of downforce caused by the need for a conservative initial design. Kovalainen finished in fifteenth position in the race, two laps down on winner Fernando Alonso.

In Australia, Trulli did not start the race and Kovalainen finished 13th. In Malaysia, Kovalainen retired with 10 laps to go, and followed this up with fourteenth in China, while in Spain Kovalainen failed to start with gearbox problems. He retired in Monaco with steering problems, and in Turkey with hydraulic problems. Kovalainen finished 16th in Canada, 2 laps down.

At Valencia on lap 9 Mark Webber's Red Bull hit Kovalainen's Lotus and went over the top, before landing and skidding into the barrier. Kovalainen recovered to the pits but retired from the race. A 17th-place finish at Silverstone and a fourteenth in Hungary sandwiched his fourth retirement of the season in Germany, due to damage caused by a collision with Sauber's Pedro de la Rosa. He retired yet again at the 2010 Singapore Grand Prix after his car caught fire in the final lap, although his decision to not go into the pit lane and instead stop at the side of the track and tackle the blaze himself was met with applause from the crowd.

2011

At the season-opening , he was forced to retire after a water leak, before recording his first finish of the season in Malaysia where he finished 15th, before a 16th-place finish in China. He finished 19th in Turkey and crashed out in Spain, having started from 15th on the grid, outqualifying the Force Indias of Paul di Resta and Adrian Sutil. In India, Kovalainen finished 14th again, running as high as tenth place during the race.

During the season, Kovalainen outqualified teammates Trulli and Karun Chandhok in 17 out of the 19 races held, and Team Lotus principal Tony Fernandes stated that he was satisfied with Kovalainen's performance over the season.

Caterham (2012–2013)

2012
Kovalainen was retained by the team – renamed Caterham F1 for  – for a third year, partnering Vitaly Petrov. This season was more stable, as Kovalainen finished all races but the initial Australian Grand Prix.

2013

Kovalainen and Petrov were dropped in favour of Charles Pic and Giedo van der Garde ahead of the  season, but Kovalainen remained on good terms with Caterham, attending the Malaysian Grand Prix as a personal guest of Tony Fernandes. Ahead of the Bahrain Grand Prix, the team announced that it had re-signed Kovalainen as one of its reserve drivers, replacing Ma Qing Hua and alongside Alexander Rossi, in which role he took part in the first free practice sessions in Bahrain and Spain.

Lotus (2013)

2013

On 14 November 2013 it was confirmed by the Lotus F1 Team that Kovalainen would stand in for regular driver Kimi Räikkönen as Räikkönen was having back surgery. Kovalainen raced at the United States Grand Prix and the Brazilian Grand Prix. He finished 14th in both races.

After Lotus
In August he completed a test for the BMW Motorsport DTM team with a BMW M4 DTM.

In August 2020, F1, in partnership with Amazon Web Services and machine learning, ranked Kovalainen as the 8th fastest Formula One driver in qualifying from 1983 to 2020. This was from a partnership with AWS (Amazon Web Services), who used an algorithm of the performance of every driver compared to their teammates to determine the fastest drivers in F1 qualifying sessions.

Race of Champions

Kovalainen competed in the 2004 Race of Champions at the Stade de France in Paris. In the first two rounds he defeated Formula One drivers David Coulthard and Jean Alesi, and then Ferrari Formula One star Michael Schumacher in a Ferrari 360 Modena in the semi-finals. He then beat World Rally Champion Sébastien Loeb in the finals using the Ferrari and a Peugeot 307 WRC car, although Kovalainen had never even sat in a rally car before, to become the first non-rally driver to win the Henri Toivonen Memorial Trophy and earn the title "Champion of Champions". He also participated in the Nations Cup alongside countryman Marcus Grönholm, but they finished in second place after Kovalainen's Ferrari 360 Modena broke down in the finals, losing to the French team of Loeb and Alesi.

He returned to the Race of Champions in 2005, defeating Bernd Schneider and Felipe Massa, but was then knocked out in the semi-finals by Tom Kristensen. Kovalainen won the Nations Cup with Grönholm in 2006, but was eliminated in the individual event at the semi-final stage by Mattias Ekström by a mere 0.0002 seconds. In 2007, Kovalainen and Grönholm again made the Nations Cup final, where they lost to the German team of Michael Schumacher and Sebastian Vettel. Kovalainen beat Vettel in the individual race, before crashing on the finish line in the next round against Andy Priaulx. He crossed the line out of control, and Priaulx pipped him.

Kovalainen returned to the event in 2010, where he withdrew after suffering a concussion in a crash after a heat race against Sébastien Loeb.

Super GT 
In 2015, Kovalainen moved to Japan to compete in Super GT (GT500 class) with Lexus. In his first season of Super GT, he drove the Lexus RC F GT500 for SARD with Kohei Hirate. The following year Kovalainen and Hirate won the Super GT championship: after going into the season's closing double header at Twin Ring Motegi in fourth place in the standings, they qualified on pole and led most of the first of the two races before dropping down to second, subsequently taking their only win of the season in the final round to clinch the title. The championship win was Kovalainen's first since winning the Nissan World Series in 2004. After the end of the 2021 season, Kovalainen announced that he would retire from the series.

Rallying 
Like many of his compatriots, Kovalainen developed an interest in rallying, with him stating it was a "childhood dream". An initial attempt at rallying was made in 2009 to contest the Arctic Rally after being released from his "restrictive" contract with McLaren in Formula One, with Kovalainen reportedly set to drive a Proton Satria Neo S2000 rally car in the 2010 Arctic Rally; this plan ultimately never came to be as Kovalainen "did not have time to seriously prepare for the rally". He would make his actual rallying debut at the same rally five years later in 2015, finishing third in his class.

Kovalainen's first foray into rallying in Japan came in 2016, entering four events of the Japan Rally Championship with co-driver Sae Kitagawa in a Toyota GT86 CS-R3 campaigned by SARD. Kovalainen retired in Hokkaido but finished second in his class at the Shinshiro Rally. Kovalainen would return to the series in 2018 with the same car and co-driver but now competing for Rally Team AICELLO on a part-time schedule, as well as the Japan Super Rally Series in 2019, also with the same car and co-driver. Kovalainen was supposed to compete in the Japan Rally Championship full-time in 2020, but the onset of the COVID-19 pandemic halted these plans; he only competed in the Chūbu-Kinki Rally that year, winning the rally. He would finally compete full-time in the series in 2021 with Kitagawa in the JN2 class; Kovalainen dominated the championship, achieving a class victory in all six races and clinching the championship with a round to spare.

Following his Super GT exit, Kovalainen concentrated on rallying full-time in the Japan Rally Championship with Rally Team AICELLO, now driving a Škoda Fabia R5 in the JN1 class. He also announced plans to potentially compete in Rally Japan, the final round of the World Rally Championship, in a WRC2 car.

24 Hours of Le Mans
Kovalainen was slated to compete in the 2021 24 Hours of Le Mans in the #72 Porsche 911 RSR-19 for HubAuto Racing, alongside fellow Super GT competitor Nick Cassidy and GT racer Dries Vanthoor; a clashing commitment caused by the rescheduling of the Suzuka Round of the 2021 Super GT Series meant that Kovalainen and Cassidy were ultimately unable to attend. They were replaced by Álvaro Parente and Maxime Martin. Despite this, Kovalainen stated that he would still be open to racing at Le Mans should an opportunity arise, although the Japan Rally Championship was still his priority.

Extreme E 
Kovalainen will make his Extreme E debut in the 2023 season for JBXE and will be partnered with Hedda Hosås.

Personal life
In 2014, Kovalainen married his English girlfriend Catherine Hyde, with whom he has been in a relationship since 2002. They live in Coppet, Switzerland. Kovalainen plays the drums and golfs in his free time.

Racing record

Career summary

Complete GP2 Series results
(key) (Races in bold indicate pole position) (Races in italics indicate fastest lap)

Complete Formula One results
(key) (Races in bold indicate pole position) (Races in italics indicate fastest lap)

 Did not finish, but was classified as he had completed more than 90% of the race distance.

Complete Super GT results
(key) (Races in bold indicate pole position) (Races in italics indicate fastest lap)

References

External links

 

1981 births
Living people
People from Suomussalmi
Finnish racing drivers
Karting World Championship drivers
British Formula Renault 2.0 drivers
British Formula Three Championship drivers
GP2 Series drivers
Finnish Formula One drivers
Renault Formula One drivers
McLaren Formula One drivers
Team Lotus (2010–11) Formula One drivers
Caterham Formula One drivers
Lotus F1 Formula One drivers
Super GT drivers
Formula One race winners
Fortec Motorsport drivers
Pons Racing drivers
Arden International drivers
Sportspeople from Kainuu
Toyota Gazoo Racing drivers
World Rally Championship drivers
Finnish expatriate sportspeople in Switzerland
Extreme E drivers